Tha Thug Show  is the third studio album by Houston recording artist Slim Thug. It was released on November 30, 2010, by his Boss Hogg Outlawz label, distributed by E1 Music. The album was supported by two singles; "Gangsta" featuring Z-Ro, and "So High" featuring B.o.B.

Track listing

Charts

References

2010 albums
Slim Thug albums
E1 Music albums
Albums produced by Lex Luger
Albums produced by Nard & B